Noel Gadiano Cabangon (born December 25, 1963) is a Filipino folk singer and composer, known for composing socially-relevant songs. In 1987, he formed the group Buklod together with Rene Boncocan and Rom Dongeto.

Early life
Noel Gadiano Cabangon was born on December 25, 1963, in the town of Rosario, La Union. At the age of ten, he began his musical career and learned to play the guitar that he borrowed from a neighbor. He made a name for himself in the local music scene in 1982 beginning in little-known folk houses and bars.

Music career
In 1987, he formed the group Buklod together with Rene Boncocan and Rom Dongeto. They produced three albums: Bukid at Buhay, Tatsulok, and Sa Kandungan ng Kalikasan. The band wrote and performed songs about the environment, human rights, and politics.

After the group disbanded, Noel Cabangon went on to record six solo albums; perform solo at music bars and private events; compose songs for the movies and for other artists; and enter the local theater industry as a musical director, as a composer or sometimes as an actor.

He wrote the book Ang Bayan Ko at Lupa: Awit ng Diwa in 2005, and co-authored Ako'y Isang Mabuting Pilipino (I Am A Good Filipino) in 2012.

Cabangon played Jesus Christ in a local production of Jesus Christ Superstar in 2000.

Discography

Albums
 Pasakalye (2000)
 Himig Nating Pag-ibig (2006)
 Byahe (2009)
 Panaginip (2011)
 Tuloy Ang Byahe (2012)
 Acoustic Noel (2014)
 Huwag Mangamba (Mga Awit Ng Pagtatagpo) (2015)

Awards and nominations

References

1963 births
Living people
Filipino folk singers
20th-century Filipino male singers
Filipino songwriters
Filipino singer-songwriters
Ilocano people
People from La Union
21st-century Filipino male singers
Filipino male stage actors